Chyornaya is a rural locality (a village) in Yugo-Kamskoye Rural Settlement, Permsky District, Perm Krai, Russia. The population was 10 as of 2010. There are 2 streets.

Geography 
Chyornaya is located 81 km southwest of Perm (the district's administrative centre) by road. Stashkovo is the nearest rural locality.

References 

Rural localities in Permsky District